Since the inception of the Algerian football league competition, the Algerian Ligue Professionnelle 1, in 1999–2000, more than 60 players have scored three goals (a hat-trick) or more in a single match. Number of hat-trick registered until the 2017–18 season 72 of 7 nationalities from Algeria, Chad, Cameroon, Madagascar, Nigeria, Ivory Coast, Senegal. The first foreign player to score a hat-trick was Cameroonian Jean Paul Yontcha for CA Bordj Bou Arréridj against JSM Béjaïa on May 10, 2004. also the most clubs recording a hat-trick is USM Alger with nine, As well as the number of players who scored more than three goals in one match is nine.

Hat-tricks

Note: The results column shows the home team score first, since 1999-2000

Statistics

Multiple hat-tricks
Bold  are still active in the Ligue Professionnelle 1.

Hat-tricks by nationality

Hat-tricks by club

References

Hat-tricks
Algerian Ligue Professionnelle 1 Hat-tricks
Algerian Ligue Professionnelle 1